Joanne Nosuchinsky (born September 26, 1988) is an American actress, beauty pageant titleholder, and co-host of Mornin'!!! with Bill Schulz and Joanne Nosuchinsky on Compound Media. She starred in Fox News' late-night comedy show Gutfeld! alongside Kat Timpf from 2015 to 2016 and appeared as a permanent panelist on the late-night show Red Eye w/ Tom Shillue, along with other Fox News programming. Nosuchinsky was also the 2013 Miss New York USA.

Early life
Nosuchinsky is from Freehold Township, New Jersey. She went to the Performing Arts Center at Howell High School. In 2010 she graduated from Rider University (summa cum laude) with a BA in Fine Arts and a focus on theatre. She has Italian and Ukrainian ancestry and is Roman Catholic.

Career
While looking through audition notices, Nosuchinsky answered one looking for pageant contestants despite never having competed in pageants before. She represented Hell's Kitchen for her win in the 2013 Miss New York USA competition. She competed in the Miss USA 2013 competition but failed to place in the Top 15. At the time of the pageants, Nosuchinsky performed in The Awesome 80s Prom, and continued to do so until the show closed.

On September 18, 2013, Nosuchinsky first appeared as a guest panelist on Red Eye w/ Greg Gutfeld on the Fox News Channel. Following the departure of Bill Schulz in November 2013, her appearances led to her becoming a full-time panelist as of the February 4, 2014 episode. From 2015 to 2016 she was also a cast member on FNC's Gutfeld! on late Saturday evenings. On the Red Eye w/ Tom Shillue broadcast at 12:00am on August 5, 2016, Nosuchinsky stated that after two and half years at Fox News, she would be leaving the network. On the August 6, 2016, broadcast of Red Eye, her last, Nosuchinsky stated that she was leaving Fox News to pursue an acting career.

Kung Flu Fighting Incident

On March 19, 2020, Nosuchinsky appeared in a video posted to Twitter and Instagram by Chrissie Mayr, singing a parody version of the popular 1970s hit "Kung Fu Fighting", changing the lyrics to "Kung Flu Fighting". The song was interpreted by some to be mocking those of Chinese descent in the midst of the global COVID-19 pandemic, and the video drew immediate backlash and criticism. While some social media users claimed they were appalled by the alleged display of racism in the video, others ridiculed the use of the word "celebrity" and "comedian" in the caption.

References

External links

 
 
 

1988 births
Living people
People from Freehold Township, New Jersey
Actresses from New Jersey
Female models from New Jersey
Television personalities from New Jersey
Catholics from New Jersey
Miss USA 2013 delegates
Fox News people
American people of Italian descent
American people of Ukrainian descent
Howell High School (New Jersey) alumni
Rider University alumni
20th-century American women
21st-century American actresses